Baoning Temple is a Buddhist temple located in Yuelu District of Changsha, Hunan, China.

History 
Baoning Temple was originally built by Master Cang in the Tang dynasty (618–907), and rebuilt by Baoning Renyong in the late Tang dynasty.

In the Yongle period (1403–1424) of Ming dynasty (1368–1644), Zhu Hui, the 19th son of Zhu Yuanzhang, received ordination as a monk because he was suppressed and persecuted by his elder brother Zhu Di.

In 1927, Changsha Suburban Farmers' Association was established in Baoning temple, where Xiao Jinguang and Teng Daiyuan often held meetings. During the Second Sino-Japanese War, the temple was one of the "Eight Temples in Changsha", and Hunan Buddhist Children's Hospital was founded in the temple.

In the autumn of 1969, the Red Guards razed Baoning Temple to the ground and used it as a forest farm. On 22 November 2009, Yuelu District People's Government presided over the reconstruction of the temple.

Architecture 
Now the existing main buildings include Shanmen (Heavenly Kings Hall), Mahavira Hall, Bell tower, Drum tower, Buddha Recitation Hall, Hall of Sangharama Palace, Meditation Hall, Dining Room, etc.

Mahavira Hall
The Mahavira Hall is modeled on the East Hall of Foguang Temple on Wutai Mountain. The wood of dalbergia odorifera came from Laos, with copper tiles on the roofs. A total of more than 180 tons of anti-corrosion alloy copper are used.

Gallery

References

Bibliography 

Buddhist temples in Hunan
Buildings and structures in Changsha
Tourist attractions in Changsha
21st-century establishments in China
21st-century Buddhist temples
Religious buildings and structures completed in 2009